Psychidarbela kalshoveni is a moth in the family Cossidae and the only species in the genus Psychidarbela. It is found on Java.

References

Natural History Museum Lepidoptera generic names catalog

Cossidae
Moths of Indonesia